Sarangab-e Boneh Pir (also Romanized as Sarangāb-e Boneh Pīr; also known as Sarangāv) is a village in Bahmai-ye Garmsiri-ye Shomali Rural District, Bahmai-ye Garmsiri District, Bahmai County, Kohgiluyeh and Boyer-Ahmad Province, Iran. At the 2006 census, its population was 101, in 20 families.

References 

Populated places in Bahmai County